Joseph Pendry (born August 5, 1947) is a former American football coach. From 1971 until 2010, he was an assistant coach or offensive coordinator for multiple teams in both the collegiate and professional ranks.

Between 2007 to 2010, Pendry served as the assistant head coach and offensive line coach for the Alabama Crimson Tide. His tenure included a SEC Championship and BCS National Championship. On January 13, 2011, he decided to retire from coaching after 41 years of serving in various capacities.

In 2019, Pendry served as the general manager of the Birmingham Iron of the Alliance of American Football.

References 

1947 births
Living people
Alabama Crimson Tide football coaches
American football ends
Buffalo Bills coaches
Carolina Panthers coaches
Chicago Bears coaches
Cleveland Browns coaches
Houston Texans coaches
Kansas City Chiefs coaches
Kansas State Wildcats football coaches
Michigan State Spartans football coaches
People from Welch, West Virginia
Pittsburgh Panthers football coaches
United States Football League coaches
Washington Redskins coaches
West Virginia Mountaineers football coaches
West Virginia Mountaineers football players
National Football League offensive coordinators